Jeanne Hébuterne with Hat and Necklace is an oil on canvas painting by Italian painter Amedeo Modigliani created in 1917.

Description 
The painting shows a modern woman with her hair tucked under a stylish hat. A special attention is given to her eyes painted in a light shade of blue which comes forward on a darker background.

Modigliani met Jeanne Hébuterne, a 19-year-old art student, in the spring of 1917 through the Russian sculptor Chana Orloff. Soon Modigliani ended his relationship with the English poet and art critic Beatrice Hastings and a short time later Hébuterne and Modigliani moved together into a studio on the Rue de la Grande Chaumière. Jeanne began to pose for him and became a principal subject for Modigliani's art. Modigliani depicted Jeanne Hébuterne in more than twenty works but never in nude. He transformed Hébuterne into an idyllic symbol of a modern woman.

A day after Modigliani’s death of tuberculous meningitis on 25 November 1920 Hébuterne being eight month pregnant, committed suicide by throwing herself from the window of her parents’ apartment.

References 

1917 paintings
Paintings by Amedeo Modigliani
Portraits